Shapeero is a surname. Notable people with the surname include:

 Tristram Shapeero, British television director

See also
 Schapiro
 Shapero
 Shapiro

Jewish surnames
Yiddish-language surnames